Qarwa al-Tyyal is a sub-district located in Attyal District, Sana'a Governorate, Yemen. Qarwa al-Tyyal had a population of 2843 according to the 2004 census.

References 

Sub-districts in Attyal District